Paul Backman (3 December 1920 – 17 March 1995) was a Finnish cyclist. He won the Finnish national road race title in 1946. He also competed at the 1948 and 1952 Summer Olympics.

References

External links
 

1920 births
1995 deaths
People from Raseborg
Finnish male cyclists
Olympic cyclists of Finland
Cyclists at the 1948 Summer Olympics
Cyclists at the 1952 Summer Olympics
Sportspeople from Uusimaa